The Moto X Style (branded as Moto X Pure Edition in the US) is the flagship third-generation of Moto X Android smartphone developed and manufactured by Motorola that was released on September 2, 2015.

Release
The Style was announced on July 28, 2015, at a press event in New York City, announced alongside its counterparts the Moto X Play and the Moto G (3rd generation).

In the United States, the phone is not offered through any carrier subsidiaries and will be released unlocked, offering the consumer quicker software updates due to avoiding carrier input. In addition, the U.S. version supports GSM, CDMA2000, HSPA+, and 14 different LTE bands, enabling it to be used on any of the country's four major carriers (AT&T, Sprint, T-Mobile, Verizon).

In December, a limited edition of the Moto X Pure Edition was launched in the United States which features three different designs to symbolize "the spirit" of Moto Maker which are designed by Jonathan Adler as an partnership with Motorola.

Specifications

Hardware
Similar to its predecessors, the phone's design features a curved rear casing and body frame made of aluminum. The rear casing and metal trim color of the phone can be customized by the customers before purchasing the phone by using the Motorola's Moto Maker which offers rear casing made of materials such as Horween leather, wood and silicone and number of colors for the metal trim.

The phone weighs  with the dimensions of  height,  width and  depth. The display of the device is  IPS TFT LCD protected with Corning Gorilla Glass 3 with the resolution of 2560 x 1440 pixels and pixel density of 520 ppi.

The device features a 64-bit Hexa-core Snapdragon 808 system-on-chip with a clock speed of 1.8 GHz and 3 GB of RAM. The internal storage configurations are available in 16 GB, 32 GB and 64 GB, with all variants featuring storage expansion via microSD card up to 128 GB.

The Moto X Style is equipped with a 21 megapixel rear facing camera utilizing phase detection autofocus along with ƒ/2.0 aperture and dual-LED tone flash. The camera is capable of recording video at 4K up to 30 fps. The front facing camera is 5 megapixel with aperture of ƒ/2.0 and LED flash.

Software
The Moto X Style comes pre-installed with Android 5.1.1 "Lollipop" utilizing a stock Android experience along with additional,  proprietary software features developed by Motorola, including their signature gestures that provide shortcuts to certain actions. Motorola has announced that the phone would be upgraded to Android 6.0 Marshmallow which would bring features such as new power management system known as "Doze". In November, Motorola released the Android 6.0 update for the users of the device in India and Brazil following the update for the users in Europe on December.

In December 2015, Motorola launched a soak test of the Android 6.0 update for the Moto X Pure Edition to a limited number users in the US. The update was released a week later for the users of Verizon, Sprint and US Cellular.

In September 2017, Motorola sent out an Android 7.0 update to all US users.

Variants 
The Moto X Style has multiple variants to support the 3G and 4G networks of different carriers in different countries:

All variants support the four 2G GSM bands 850/900/1800/1900.

References

Android (operating system) devices
Motorola mobile phones
Mobile phones introduced in 2015